Echinovelleda is a genus of longhorn beetles of the subfamily Lamiinae, containing the following species:

 Echinovelleda antiqua Gressitt, 1951
 Echinovelleda chinensis Breuning, 1936

References

Phrissomini